The 2012 Wolverhampton City Council election took place on 3 May 2012 to elect members of the City of Wolverhampton Council in England. This was on the same day as other 2012 United Kingdom local elections.

References

2012
2010s in the West Midlands (county)
2012 English local elections